Mooga is a rural locality in the Maranoa Region, Queensland, Australia. In the  Mooga had a population of 17 people.

History 
The name Mooga was derived from the pastoral run name, which was an Aboriginal word in the Mandandanji language, meaning kingfisher.

Mooga Provisional School opened on 1 August 1904. On 1 January 1909 it became Mooga State School. It closed on 18 April 1937.

In the  Mooga had a population of 17 people.

References 

Maranoa Region
Localities in Queensland